Nili (also Romanized as Nīlī) is a village in Khormarud-e Shomali Rural District, in the Central District of Azadshahr County, Golestan Province, Iran. In a 2006 census, its population was 1,048, in 226 families.

References 

Populated places in Azadshahr County